George Gilman is a politician from the U.S. state of Oregon. He served as the state representative for District 55 of the Oregon House of Representatives, the second largest House district in Oregon, from 2003 to 2011.  A Republican, he served as vice-chair of the Transportation Committee as vice-chair and the Ways and Means Subcommittee on Transportation and Economic Development.

Gilman represented the people of Lake and Crook Counties and of portions of Jackson, Deschutes, and Klamath counties. He was elected to the newly created District 55 in November 2002, and was elected to a fourth term in 2008.

Biography
Gilman lives in Medford and has lived in Oregon all of his life.  He graduated from Crater High School in Central Point, where he served as district treasurer in the Southern Oregon District of the Oregon FFA Association and received the Star Farmer Degree (now called the Oregon FFA State Degree), the most prestigious award in Oregon FFA. He majored in dairy husbandry at Oregon State University, then returned home to attend to the family dairy farm, where he milked cows in the morning and attended college in the afternoon, receiving his BS degree with honors from Southern Oregon College (now known as Southern Oregon University).

A third-generation dairy farmer, Gilman spent 26 years in the dairy industry.  In 1986, he was elected to represent House District 50, serving during the 1987-89 sessions. After leaving office he was employed by Access, Inc., a community action agency, and next by Pacific Retirement Services, where he spent the next 11 years managing the Foster Grandparent Program in three southern Oregon counties.

Gilman has served on and chaired the Oregon Dairy Products Commission, Oregon Community Service Commission, Oregon Beef Council, Rogue Community College Board of Directors, Rogue Valley Transit Board, and Quail Point Rotary Club.  He is currently a member of the State Lands Advisory Committee, Honorary Advisory Board of the Oregon-Fujian Sister State Association, Council of State Governments, West, Addictions Recovery Center Board, and the Governor's Commission on Senior Services.

He and his wife Sandy, who also serves as his legislative assistant, have been married 45 years.  They have two adult children and two grandchildren, both of whom have participated in his campaign activities.

References 
 Congress.org

Republican Party members of the Oregon House of Representatives
Southern Oregon University alumni
Politicians from Medford, Oregon
Living people
People from Central Point, Oregon
21st-century American politicians
Year of birth missing (living people)